Eupithecia atuni is a moth in the family Geometridae. It is endemic to south-western China (Yunnan).

The forewings are pale buff and the hindwings are somewhat paler.

References

External links

Moths described in 2006
Endemic fauna of Yunnan
Moths of Asia
atuni